Edward McMahon (? – 1901) was an Irish Home Rule League politician.

He was elected Home Rule Member of Parliament (MP) for Limerick City at a by-election in 1883 but did not seek re-election when the seat was reduced to one member in 1885.

References

External links
 

UK MPs 1880–1885
1901 deaths
Home Rule League MPs
Members of the Parliament of the United Kingdom for County Limerick constituencies (1801–1922)